The twelfth series of the British semi-reality television programme The Only Way Is Essex was confirmed on 30 January 2014 when it had been announced that it had renewed for a further three series, the eleventh, twelfth and thirteenth. The series began on 22 June 2014 and started with two The Only Way Is Marbs specials. This series focused on the blossoming relationship between Chloe and Elliott, Bobby ending the romance between Harry after finding out he's still seeing his ex-boyfriend, the rivalry between Chloe and Ferne after cheating rumours came to light, and Arg's attempts to win back Lydia.  It was the last series to feature on ITV2 before moving to ITVBe later that year.

Cast

Episodes

{| class="wikitable plainrowheaders" style="width:100%; background:#fff;"
! style="background:#F7D358;"| Seriesno.
! style="background:#F7D358;"| Episodeno.
! style="background:#F7D358;"| Title
! style="background:#F7D358;"| Original air date
! style="background:#F7D358;"| Duration
! style="background:#F7D358;"| UK viewers

|}

Reception

Ratings

References

The Only Way Is Essex
2014 British television seasons